New Shores is the debut album by English rock band Black Submarine, released on 10 March 2014. The album was produced in Denmark and the United Kingdom at Nick McCabe's studio on Walworth Road at Elephant and Castle junction between 2012 and 2013.

The album was preceded by lead single "Here So Rain" published on SoundCloud and YouTube in January 2014 before a digital single of the radio edit in March 2014. The band released a video for "Heart First" on 22 April 2014, and the song was released in June 2014 as the album's second single.

Track listing

Personnel
Nick McCabe - guitar, producer
Simon Jones - bass
Davide Rossi - vocals, strings, keyboards
Mig Schillace - drums
Amelia Tucker - vocals
Charley Bickers - vocals on "Just a Second Away" and "Starling"
Jim Spencer - mixed by
Frank Arkwright - mastered by at Abbey Road Studios
Elly McCabe - vocals on "Lover"

References

2014 debut albums